Independence  is  a census-designated place in Inyo County, California. It is the county seat of Inyo County, California. The population of this census-designated place was 669 at the 2010 census, up from 574 at the 2000 census.

Geography

The small town of Independence is bisected by U.S. Route 395, the main north-south highway through the Owens Valley.

The Sierra Nevada mountains to the west lie within the John Muir Wilderness Area. Onion Valley, one of the principal entry routes to the John Muir Wilderness, is accessed via the Onion Valley road which heads directly west out of Independence. This trail takes hikers to Kings Canyon/Sequoia National Parks which protect the Sierra Nevada west of the divide between the Owens Valley on the east and the rivers which drain into the San Joaquin Valley to the west.

Independence is a popular resupply location for hikers trekking the 2,650 mile long Pacific Crest Trail which extends from the Mexican border to Canada along the crest of the Sierra Nevada and Cascade Ranges. The highest pass along the entire trail, 13,153 foot (4009 m) Forester Pass, is directly west of Independence.

Climate
Independence, as well as most of the Owens Valley, has a high hot desert climate with hot summers and cool winters. The highest recorded temperature was 115 °F (46 °C) in June 2017. There are an average of 97.7 days annually with highs of 90 °F (32 °C) or higher and an average of 88.1 days with lows of 32 °F (0 °C) or less. Annual precipitation averages only . Snowfall varies greatly from year to year, averaging only .

History

Charles Putnam founded a trading post at the site in 1861. It became known as Putnam's, and later Little Pine from the Little Pine Creek. The site of Putnam's Cabin, across the street from the Inyo County Courthouse, is a California Historical Landmark # 223.  

Independence began as the US Army Camp Independence (two miles north of the current town) established by Lieutenant Colonel George S. Evans on July 4, 1862. Colonel Evans established the camp at the request of local settlers who feared  hostilities from the local indigenous tribes. The camp was soon closed, but was re-established as Fort Independence when hostilities resumed in 1865. The fort was finally abandoned in 1877, and it is currently a reservation for the Fort Independence Indian Community of Paiute Indians.

Independence became the seat of Inyo County in 1866 when its chief competitor for the honor, a mining camp called Kearsarge, disappeared under an avalanche.

The first post office at Independence was established in 1866.

United States Army General John K. Singlaub (1921 – 2022) was born in Independence.

Museums
The Eastern California Museum with extensive collections, exhibits, and programs; is located at 155 North Grant Street in Independence.

The home of author Mary Austin, the author of The Land of Little Rain, is preserved as a museum located at 235 Market Street in Independence.

Library
The Inyo County Free Library is in the Inyo County Courthouse.

Demographics

The 2010 United States Census reported that Independence had a population of 669. The racial makeup of Independence was 493 (73.7%) Whites, 6 (0.9%) African Americans, 98 (14.6%) Native Americans, 8 (1.2%) Asians, 1 (0.1%) Pacific Islanders, 28 (4.2%) from other races, and 35 (5.2%) from two or more races. Hispanic or Latino of any race were 93 persons (13.9%).

The Census reported that 603 people (90.1% of the population) lived in households, 8 (1.2%) lived in non-institutionalized group quarters, and 58 (8.7%) were institutionalized.

There were 301 households, out of which 57 (18.9%) had children under the age of 18 living in them, 131 (43.5%) were opposite-sex married couples living together, 20 (6.6%) had a female householder with no husband present, 8 (2.7%) had a male householder with no wife present.  There were 13 (4.3%) unmarried opposite-sex partnerships, and 3 (1.0%) same-sex married couples or partnerships. 122 households (40.5%) were made up of individuals, and 47 (15.6%) had someone living alone who was 65 years of age or older. The average household size was 2.00.  There were 159 families (52.8% of all households); the average family size was 2.70.

The population was spread out, with 100 people (14.9%) under the age of 18, 54 people (8.1%) aged 18 to 24, 117 people (17.5%) aged 25 to 44, 259 people (38.7%) aged 45 to 64, and 139 people (20.8%) who were 65 years of age or older.  The median age was 51.1 years. For every 100 females, there were 105.8 males.  For every 100 females age 18 and over, there were 106.2 males.

The homeowner vacancy rate was 5.8%; the rental vacancy rate was 6.1%.  410 people (61.3% of the population) lived in owner-occupied housing units and 193 people (28.8%) lived in rental housing units.

Politics

See also 
Big Pine volcanic field
Carson and Colorado Railway
Roadside Heritage - of the Eastern Sierra
Owens Valley
Manzanar
Mount Whitney Fish Hatchery

References

External links
Official Eastern California Museum website
Friends of the Eastern California Museum website
Attractions in and near Independence
Annual Community Events in Independence

Census-designated places in Inyo County, California
County seats in California
Owens Valley
Populated places in the Mojave Desert
Census-designated places in California
1861 establishments in California
Populated places established in 1861